The 1991 Yobe State gubernatorial election occurred on December 14, 1991. SDP candidate Bukar Ibrahim won the election, defeating NRC Sadiq Maina.

Conduct
The gubernatorial election was conducted using an open ballot system. Primaries for the two parties to select their flag bearers were conducted on October 19, 1991.

The election occurred on December 14, 1991. SDP candidate Bukar Ibrahim won the election, defeating NRC Sadiq Maina. Bukar Ibrahim polled 127,935 votes, while Sadiq Maina polled 104,542 votes.

References 

Gubernatorial election 1991
December 1991 events in Nigeria
Yobe